Ondřej Rolenc (born 7 November 1991) is a Czech male canoeist who won 29 medals at senior level at the Wildwater Canoeing World Championships.

Biography
Rolenc won a Wildwater Canoeing World Cup in C1.

Medals at the World Championships
Senior

References

External links
 

1991 births
Living people
Czech male canoeists
Place of birth missing (living people)